Francisco "Cobo" Zuluaga Rodríguez (4 February 1929 in Medellín, Colombia – 8 November 1993) was a Colombian footballer. He competed for the Colombia national football team at the 1962 FIFA World Cup, which was held in Chile.

Playing career

Club
At age 15, Zuluaga began playing as a central defender for Medellín side 7 de Agosto. Next, he joined Unión Indulana where he would be recruited by Millonarios. He made his professional debut with Millonarios in 1948, and won five Colombian league titles with the club. He finished his career playing for Santa Fe and Atlético Nacional.

Managerial career
After retiring as a player, Zuluaga became a football manager. He had a spell in charge of the Colombia national team between 1968 and 1969 during its failed bid to qualify for the 1970 FIFA World Cup in Mexico.

References

1929 births
1993 deaths
Colombian footballers
Footballers from Medellín
Colombia international footballers
1962 FIFA World Cup players
Colombian football managers
Colombia national football team managers
Millonarios F.C. players
Independiente Santa Fe footballers
Atlético Nacional footballers
Categoría Primera A players
Association football central defenders